Pac-Man 256 is an endless running video game developed by Hipster Whale and 3 Sprockets and published by Bandai Namco Entertainment. The game is part of the Pac-Man series and is inspired by the original Pac-Man game's infamous Level 256 glitch. The game was originally released as a free-to-play title for iOS and Android on August 20, 2015. A port of the game for PlayStation 4, Xbox One, and PC (Windows, macOS, Linux) by Bandai Namco Studios Vancouver, featuring additional features, was released on June 21, 2016.

Gameplay
Pac-Man 256 sees the players take control of Pac-Man as he continues across an endless maze, collecting dots and power-ups while avoiding enemy ghosts. The game ends if Pac-Man comes into contact with a ghost or falls behind and is consumed by a chasing glitch at the bottom of the maze. Eating 256 dots in a row awards the player a blast that clears all on-screen enemies. Along with power pellets, which enable Pac-Man to eat ghosts, Pac-Man can equip and obtain various power-ups such as lasers, tornadoes, and clones to attack the ghosts, as well as collect score-multiplying fruit. Up to three power-ups can be equipped. Power-ups are unlocked by waiting 24 hours after unlocking a power-up. In the console and PC versions, they are unlocked by eating a specified number of Pac-Dots.

Prior to version 2.0, the game featured a "credit" system, which would require one credit to be used if a game was played with power-ups equipped or the player wished to revive Pac-Man. Version 2.0 replaced the Credits with Coins, which are obtained by clearing missions, collecting them on the maze or by viewing sponsored videos, which can be used to upgrade power-ups, unlock themes (in the mobile version), or revive Pac-Man.

There are also themes which change the look of the game, that can be purchased with large amounts of Coins or by spending real money. In the console and PC versions, all themes are unlocked by default.

The console and PC versions of the game adds an exclusive cooperative multiplayer game mode, where up to four players work together to set the highest score possible. The appearance of each Pac-Man can be customized. Like the main game, the goal is for every player to get as far as possible and contribute to the group score as much as possible. If a player is caught by a ghost, a player power-up appears, which revives that player. The game ends once the last player still in play dies, be it by getting caught by a ghost or consumed by the glitch.

Each ghost has their own specific behavior: Blinky (red) actively chases Pac-Man, Pinky (pink) rushes forward whenever Pac-Man enters her sight, Inky (cyan) loops around specific areas, Clyde (orange) travels downwards while changing to Pac-Man's nearest direction, Sue (purple) slowly moves horizontally towards Pac-Man's direction in groups of three, Funky (green) roams around in a horizontal line in groups of four, Spunky (gray) sleeps in a spot, but awakens and chases Pac-Man if he gets near, and a new ghost named Glitchy that has the ability to teleport while chasing Pac-Man.

Reception 
Pac-Man 256 received "generally favorable" reviews according to review aggregator Metacritic.

Legacy 
The console version of Pac-Man 256 is included in the compilation title Pac-Man Museum +, released in 2022. It would also mark the first time the game was ported to Nintendo Switch.

Awards
Pac-Man 256 was nominated for Best Mobile/Handheld Game at The Game Awards 2015, but lost to Lara Croft Go.

See also 

 Outfolded

References

External links
 NAMCO Entertainment America Inc. page
 Hipster Whale page 
 3 Sprockets Pty Ltd page 

Pac-Man
Bandai Namco games
2015 video games
IOS games
Android (operating system) games
Endless runner games
PlayStation 4 games
Windows games
Xbox One games
Video games developed in Australia
Video games scored by Christopher Larkin (composer)
Linux games
MacOS games